The black-billed flycatcher (Aphanotriccus audax) is a species of bird in the family Tyrannidae. It was first described by American naturalist Edward William Nelson in 1912 as Praedo audax. It is found in Colombia and Panama and its natural habitat is subtropical or tropical moist lowland forests. It is threatened by habitat loss.

References

black-billed flycatcher
Birds of Panama
Birds of Colombia
black-billed flycatcher
Taxonomy articles created by Polbot